Krasków may refer to the following places in Poland:
Krasków, Lower Silesian Voivodeship (south-west Poland)
Krasków, Opole Voivodeship (south-west Poland)